Bezirhane can refer to:

 Bezirhane, Gölbaşı
 Bezirhane, Karayazı